Carncorran Glebe (Irish: Carn Corráin (hook-shaped heap of stones)) is a townland in County Tyrone, Northern Ireland. It is situated in the historic barony of Omagh West and the civil parish of Ardstraw and covers an area of 243 acres.

The population of the townland declined during the 19th century:

The townland contains one Scheduled Historic Monument: a Portal tomb: Giant's Grave (grid ref:  H2889 8243). The portal tomb consists of two large mis-matched portal stones nearly 3m tall and a tiny door-stone.

See also
List of townlands of County Tyrone
List of archaeological sites in County Tyrone

References

Townlands of County Tyrone
Archaeological sites in County Tyrone
Civil parish of Ardstraw